João William Alves de Jesus (born 11 June 1996), better known as just William, is a Brazilian professional footballer who plays for Inhulets Petrove.

References

External links 
 
 

1996 births
Living people
Brazilian footballers
Association football defenders
Brazilian expatriate footballers
Expatriate footballers in Belarus
Expatriate footballers in Ukraine
Brazilian expatriate sportspeople in Ukraine
Estanciano Esporte Clube players
Esporte Clube Juventude players
Concórdia Atlético Clube players
Luverdense Esporte Clube players
Goiás Esporte Clube players
Santa Cruz Futebol Clube players
FC Rukh Brest players
FC Inhulets Petrove players
FC Dinamo Minsk players
Sportspeople from Sergipe